KMC Chain Industrial Co., Ltd. is a roller chain manufacturer headquartered in Taiwan, R.O.C. with corporate entities in the US, Continental Chain Company, and Europe, KMC Chain Europe BV. They make cam driving chains, balance driving chains, oil pump chains, motorcycle chains, and industrial chains. They manufacture and market bicycle chains and master links under their own KMC brand and supply them to others, including Shimano. KMC chains are used in the Tour de France by riders such as Gustav Larsson, Swedish time trial champion. KMC was founded by Charles Wu in 1977, and was the largest bicycle chain manufacturer in the world in 2011.

Compatibility 
They are known for working well with Shimano, SRAM, and Campagnolo drivetrains. Bicycle manufacturers, such as Specialized Bicycle Components provide KMC chains on new bicycles with SRAM and Shimano components. 2013 Bianchi team bicycles include a KMC X11SL chain on a Campagnolo Super Record EPS electronic transmission.

Varieties 
KMC makes bicycle chains with roller widths of 3/16, 1/8, 3/32, 11/128 inches and with external widths compatible with single-speed, 6, 7, 8, 9, 10, and 11-speed drivetrains. They offer chains with hollow pins and with cut-outs in the links and made of stainless steel, with a titanium nitride coating, or painted in a variety of colors. In 2012, KMC launched a chain model specifically for electric bicycles. In 2010, KMC won the iF Product Design Gold Award for its BMX ‘Kool Knight Chain’.

See also
 List of companies of Taiwan
Other notable bicycle chain manufacturers include:
Campagnolo
Rohloff AG
Shimano
SRAM
Wippermann

References

External links 
www.kmcchain.us KMC Chain American Corporation, LA Verne, California, USA
www.kmcchain.eu KMC Chain Europe BV, Nijehaske Heerenveen, The Netherlands
www.kmcchain.com KMC Chain Industrial Co., Ltd, Taiwan, R.O.C
www.facebook.com/kmcbicyclechain/ KMC Facebook

Cycle parts manufacturers
Manufacturing companies of Taiwan